Schaal Sels is a single-day road bicycle race held annually in September in Merksem, Belgium. Since 2005, the race is organized as a 1.1 event on the UCI Europe Tour.

Winners

External links
 Official Website 

UCI Europe Tour races
Recurring sporting events established in 1921
1921 establishments in Belgium
Cycle races in Belgium